Squatting in the Netherlands (Dutch: kraken) is the occupation of unused or derelict buildings or land without the permission of the owner. The modern squatters movement (Dutch: kraakbeweging) began in the 1960s in the Netherlands. By the 1980s, it had become a powerful anarchist social movement which regularly came into conflict with the state, particularly in Amsterdam with the Vondelstraat and coronation riots.

Some squats in cities have successfully legalised into still extant social centres and housing cooperatives such as ACU in Utrecht, the Grote Broek in Nijmegen, the Landbouwbelang in Maastricht, ORKZ in Groningen, the Poortgebouw in Rotterdam and Vrankrijk in Amsterdam. There have also been squats in the countryside such as Fort Pannerden and the Ruigoord village.

Squatting was criminalised in October 2010. Between then and November 2014, 529 people were arrested. Some recent high-profile evictions have included ADM, the Tabakspanden and De Vloek. The social movement continues in diminished form, with squatting still being used by certain groups, for example the migrant collective We Are Here.

Beginnings

During the Great Depression of the 1930s, many workers lost their jobs and were unable to pay rent. This resulted in people occupying houses in order to force a rental agreement, although they did not see themselves as a housing movement. Their legal justification was based on a 1914 decision by the Supreme Court which ruled that in order to show residential use in a property, all that was needed was a chair, a table and a bed.

Squatting in the Netherlands in its modern form has its origins in the 1960s, when the country was suffering a housing shortage whilst at the same time many properties stood derelict. Property owners kept buildings empty in order to speculate and drive the market price upwards. As youth protest movements burgeoned, in particular Provo movement, squatting became seen as a political, anti-speculation protest. Marking the emergence of a squatters movement (Dutch: kraakbeweging) which focused upon collective action rather than individual initiatives, the term for squatting changed from "secret occupation" (Dutch: clandestien bezetten) to "cracking" (Dutch: kraken) and squatters became known as krakers.

As well as mobilising the 1914 decision, squatters employed a 1971 Supreme Court ruling that the concept of domestic peace (Dutch: huisvrede) required permission from the current occupant for anybody else to enter a property. This meant that property owners were required to evict squatters by taking them to court, instead of forcing entry. This came about after squatters in Nijmegen were evicted from a property and prosecuted by the owner, who claimed that since the house was for sale it was in use. The squatters were convicted of an offence but appealed the decision and ultimately the Supreme Court ruled that a "on the basis of normal language use, 'a house in use' can only mean 'a house in use as a house'".

Consolidation

The squatting movement took on an increasingly anarchist tone during the 1980s. In the Vondelstraat Riots, police moved to evict residents from a squatted building on the corner of Vondelstraat in Amsterdam, but it was immediately reoccupied and barricades erected. Street fights ensued between riot police and the squatters, with the building only being cleared when a military tank demolished the street barricades. Queen Beatrix's coronation later that year saw more riots when squatters chanted "No home, no coronation" (Dutch: Geen woning, geen kroning). In Groningen the eviction of the WNC (Wolters-Noordhoff Complex) squat in 1990 led to 137 arrests and the mayor called it war.

Some squats have gone through a process of legalisation, in which the building becomes owned or rented by the former squatters. In Amsterdam, the city council bought 200 buildings in the early 1980s, handing them over to housing associations which then made contracts with individual tenants. The Poortgebouw in Rotterdam was squatted in 1980 and two years later the inhabitants agreed to pay rent to the city council, forming a housing cooperative of 30 people with a bar and alternative venue on the ground floor. In Amsterdam, OCCII, OT301 and Vrankrijk are all examples of legalised social centres. In the 2010s, Vrankrijk hosts mainly punk and queer parties. The NDSM former shipyard zone was recognised as a cultural hotspot and breeding place, successfully institutionalising in the early 2000s. The Grote Broek in Nijmegen was squatted in 1984 and legalised in the 2000s. The  ACU in Utrecht was squatted in 1976 and bought by the squatters in 1994. It provides a venue space for benefit concerts, an anarchist library, a bar and a vegan restaurant. ORKZ, or the Old Roman Catholic Hospital (Dutch: Oude Rooms-Katholieke Ziekenhuis), is located in Groningen on the Verlengde Hereweg. The hospital was squatted in August 1979 and legalised in 1986. As of 2004, 250 people lived there in 235 apartments. Another 150 people made use of the ateliers. A derelict parking lot was taken over and made into a guerilla garden. Herbs and vegetables were grown in raised beds, fruit bushes were planted and an apiary was set up. The garden was legalised by the city council in 2012.

There are also squats which refused or were unable to legalise such as De Blauwe Aanslag in The Hague, Het Slaakhuis in Rotterdam, ADM in Amsterdam and the Landbouwbelang in Maastricht. The Landbouwbelang is a former grain silo beside the Meuse river which houses 15 people and provides space for art exhibitions, music events and various festivals. Vrijplaats Koppenhinksteeg in Leiden was occupied in 1968 and eventually evicted in 2010. The complex, which included a bar, a freeshop, a library meeting rooms and offices for a group supporting illegal migrants, had been negotiating with the city council in order to legalise its activities until the talks stalled in 2008.

There are also some squats in the countryside such as a squatted village called Ruigoord near Amsterdam. Fort Pannerden (a military fort built in 1869 near to Nijmegen) was occupied in 2000 by people concerned about the state of the building. It was evicted on November 8, 2006, by a massive police operation which used military machinery and cost one million euros. The fort was then re-squatted and the occupiers discussed a settlement with the local council and Staatsbosbeheer, the owner.

Developments

In 1987, the law was changed so that an owner could take anonymous squatters to court, rather than being required to know their names. A law was passed in 1994 which made it illegal to squat a building which had been empty for less than one year. After this, it became conventional for squatters to call the police after occupying a building and if the police were satisfied that the building had been empty for more than a year and that the squatters were living there (as evidenced by having a chair, a table and a bed) then the owner would need to make a court case to regain possession. Thus, squatting became a tactic to provide housing and also to fight speculation, conserve monumental buildings, provide groups with spaces and so on. An example of conservational squatting is Huize Ivicke in Wassenaar, a building which the owner refuses to repair. The villa was placed on a list of the most endangered monuments in Europe and it was squatted in 2018 by people wanting to prevent further dilapidation.

Squatting in the Netherlands, particularly in Amsterdam, became a rather institutionalised process, although the squatters movement continued to evolve with one development being the occupation of large office buildings by refugee collectives. One such group, We Are Here was established in 2012 and the collective had squatted over 30 buildings and parks by the end of 2017.  In a different development, squatting was used as a tool to contest the construction of the Betuweroute, a freight railway route from Rotterdam to Germany.  and other environmental protestors occupied several houses due to be demolished. This included a failed attempt to squat a building in Angeren.

Criminalisation

Squatting in the Netherlands became a criminal offence on 1 October 2010. In 2016, a report was published by the Dutch Government which stated that between October 2010 and November 2014,  529 people had been arrested for the new crime of squatting, in 213 separate incidents. Of these arrested, 210 received convictions and 42 were found not guilty.

Following criminalisation, in Amsterdam an estimated 330 squats were evicted in two years. Contested evictions included ADM, the Tabakspanden on Spuistraat, the Valreep and Villa Friekens. ADM was a former shipyard squatted for 21 years before its eventual eviction in 2019. Around 130 people lived there in buildings, boats and temporary structures. De Vloek social centre in The Hague was evicted in September 2015 after long political struggle. There were seven arrests. In Utrecht, the disused Amsterdamsestraatweg Water Tower was occupied repeatedly in protest at the criminalisation of squatting. In 2019, a resquat was unsuccessful.

Table of notable squats

See also 
 Squatting in Australia
 Squatting in England and Wales
 Squatting in the United States

References

Further reading
 ADILKNO (1994) Cracking The Movement  Also available online 
 Bouwknecht et al. (2005) Witboek Kraken 
 Breek et al. (2001) Laat 1000 Vrijplaatsen Bloien – Onderzoek naar vrijplaatsen in Amsterdam 
 Buchholz, T. (2016) Struggling for recognition and affordable housing in Amsterdam and Hamburg: resignation, resistance, relocation(PhD) 
 Dee, E.T.C. (2015) Flowers shed petals: Squatted social centres in Amsterdam
 Duivenvoorden, E. (2000) Een voet tussen de deur 
 Jenkins, David (2014) Het Oude RKZ door de ogen van de buurman
 Owens, L. (2016) Amsterdam Squatters on the Road: A Case Study in Territorial and Relational Urban Politics in (eds) Knud Andresen & Bart van der Steen A European Youth Revolt European Perspectives on Youth Protest and Social Movements in the 1980s 
 SPOK (1994) De heren zijn toch geen inbrekers? 
Truijen, K. (2019) Architecture of Appropriation – On Squatting as Spatial Practice

External links
 Map of squatting in Amsterdam
 Map of squatting in Rotterdam
 Squatting in Leiden
 Squatting in Wageningen
 Staatsarchief (in Dutch)

 
Squats in the Netherlands
Social centres in the Netherlands
Housing in the Netherlands
Anarcho-punk
DIY culture